Legionella tucsonensis is a Gram-negative bacterium from the genus Legionella with a single polar flagellum, which was isolated from the pleural fluid of a renal transplant patient with immunosuppressive therapy in Tucson, Arizona.

References

External links
Type strain of Legionella tucsonensis at BacDive -  the Bacterial Diversity Metadatabase

Legionellales
Bacteria described in 1990